Fudbalski klub ČSK Pivara (Serbian Cyrillic: ЧСК Пивара) is a football club from Čelarevo, a village near Bačka Palanka, Serbia. It was founded in 1925 as ČOSK ( or ЧОСК, Чебски Омладински Спортски Клуб). The village of Čelarevo was called Čeb before World War II, hence the name.

History
In 1946, the club changed its name to Radnički Čelarevo until 1950 when the club was called SK Podunavlje. By the end of the year, the club had entered to the Championship of Novi Sad. They played there for two years. In 1952 they played in the Regional League of Novi Sad. In 1953 Podunavlje and another football club called Krajišnik joined and formed ČSK. From 1964 to 1967, the club played in First League of Vojvodina (Yugoslav 4th tier). They again entered the league in 1969 and stayed there for three more seasons. For seventeen years they played in lower regional leagues but in 1989 they returned to the First League of Vojvodina. They stayed there for only one season but they got back after only one season in lower league. In 1993 club entered the Third League, called Serbian League North. It managed to enter to the Second League of FR Yugoslavia in 1998 and stayed there for four years. From 2002 to 2005 they played in Serbian League Vojvodina (which was before called North). In 2005 they got back in Second League, which is now called Serbian First League. Lav pivo (Lion beer) was the sponsor of ČSK and Pivara means Brewery. The club was formed in 1925. The club is associated with Pivara Čelarevo one of the most popular and well known beer companies in Serbia.

Former players
For a list of all current and former players with a Wikipedia article, please see: :Category:FK ČSK Čelarevo players.

Stadium
Stadium FK ČSK Pivara holds 3,000 people.

References

External links
 Profile at Prva Liga website
 Club profile and squad at Srbijafudbal
 FK ČSK info

Association football clubs established in 1925
Football clubs in Serbia
Football clubs in Yugoslavia
Football clubs in Vojvodina
Bačka Palanka
1925 establishments in Serbia
Works association football clubs in Serbia